The barber perch (Caesioperca rasor), also called the barber sea perch, red perch or Tasmanian barber, is endemic to Australia, found from southern Victoria to southwestern Western Australia, including Tasmania.

Description
Females and larger juveniles are a pinkish colour with a large black vertical bar on the flank towards the posterior end and a blue streak just under the eye. Smaller juveniles additionally have a black head. Males are similarly marked but their overall hue is silvery or yellowish. They additionally have blue margins to the fins and a small blue spot on each scale.

It differs from the closely related Butterfly perch by having a more slender body and males are more blue with a darker bar, rather than blotch, on the side.  The two species sometimes form mixed shoals.

Behaviour
It is largely a piscivore.

References

barber perch
Endemic fauna of Australia
Taxa named by John Richardson (naturalist)
barber perch